State Highway 90 (SH 90) is a state highway that runs  between  Madisonville, Texas and Navasota.  It was originally designated by 1933 along its current route, except that it extended southwest from Navasota to Brenham.  This section was transferred to SH 105 in 1973.

History

The routing between Madisonville and Navasota was originally set before the state's highway system was started.  By 1919, a rail route between the cities existed, run by the Great Northern Railroad. By 1922, a basic highway had been built between the cities (designated October 20, 1919 from  Buffalo southwest via Jewett and Normangee to Navasota; rerouted on July 20, 1920 to the Madisonville to Navasota route), which was designated as State Highway 32A, which branched off the main State Highway 32 in Madisonville. On August 21, 1923, the state roads department had begun to get rid of most suffixed spur routes, so this route was again renumbered as State Highway 90. By 1926, it extended to Brenham, replacing a portion of State Highway 105. The route remained a  minimally serviced dirt road until the early 1930s, when paving occurred. Numerous reroutings occurred during the next 70 years, including being rerouted away from the town of Washington on February 24, 1953 (the old route through Washington was redesignated as FM 912) and the eventual transferral of the section between Brenham and Navasota back to State Highway 105 on February 28, 1973. On April 18, 1985, SH 90 was rerouted over Spur 174 to US 75, with the old route north to SH 21/US 190 becoming part of Spur 174.

Route description
SH 90 begins at an intersection northeast of Navasota with State Highway 6 and State Highway 105.  The route travels to the northeast, first passing Navasota High School.  It then travels through the western side of Anderson, passing a block west of the Grimes County Courthouse.  It continues north out of Anderson through central Texas farmlands.  It reaches Roans Prairie and an intersection with State Highway 30.  It continues north through Bedias and other lightly populated sections of Grimes County before entering Madison County.  The route enters Madisonville from the south, reaching an intersection with South Street. It turns east at South Street, reaching its northern terminus two blocks later at State Highway 75 (formerly US Route 75), while State Spur 174 continues northward from South Street to an intersection with US Route 190 and State Highway 21.

Junction list

References

090
Transportation in Grimes County, Texas
Transportation in Madison County, Texas